The 1998 African Judo Championships were the 20th edition of the African Judo Championships, organised by the African Judo Union and were held in Dakar, Senegal from 23 July 1998 to 26 July 1998.

References

External links
 

African Judo Championships
African Championships
Sports competitions in Senegal
Judo competitions in Senegal
Judo Championships